Zdislava may refer to:

 Zdislava (Liberec District), a market town in the Czech Republic
 Zdislava, a variation of Zdeslava, a feminine given name
 Zdislava Berka, saint
 5275 Zdislava, an asteroid